Carlos Zegarra may refer to:
 Carlos Zegarra (footballer)
 Carlos Zegarra (judoka)